Satyavedu is a town in Tirupati district of the Indian state of Andhra Pradesh. It borders the state of Tamil Nadu on its southern part. It is located 60 km north of Chennai metropolitan citiy. It is also connected with Sri City on its exterior area. It is one of mandals in Sullurupeta revenue division and headquarters of Satyavedu mandal.

Demographics
As per 2011 census, the town has total population of 52,979 constituting 25,995 males and 28,984 females. It is a part of Satyavedu Constituency, which has a total population of  2,77,010.

References

Towns in Tirupati district
Mandal headquarters in Tirupati district